Donald Cole (born September 6, 1981) is an American professional basketball player for Al-Nasr of the Libyan Division I Basketball League. He played college basketball for Sam Houston State and was named Southland Player of the Year in 2003.

References

External links

1981 births
Living people
American expatriate basketball people in Bulgaria
American expatriate basketball people in France
American expatriate basketball people in Hungary
American expatriate basketball people in Lebanon
American expatriate basketball people in Luxembourg
American expatriate basketball people in North Macedonia
American expatriate basketball people in Poland
American expatriate basketball people in the United Arab Emirates
American expatriate basketball people in the United Kingdom
American expatriate basketball people in Venezuela
American men's basketball players
Atomerőmű SE players
Basketball players from Texas
BC Levski Sofia players
Cholet Basket players
Czarni Słupsk players
Gaiteros del Zulia players
Glasgow Rocks players
Navarro Bulldogs basketball players
Sportspeople from Port Arthur, Texas
Power forwards (basketball)
Sam Houston Bearkats men's basketball players
ZTE KK players
Sagesse SC basketball players